Sheena Colette York is an American actress. She made her acting debut on stage as a child in several theatrical productions, ultimately landing her in ongoing studies at various New York acting schools such as American Academy of Dramatic Arts.

Colette appeared in LoCash Cowboy's music video "Here Comes Summer" directed by Brian Lazzaro of Stroudavarious Records, Thalia's "Ten Paciencia" directed by Emilio Estefan, and Alejandra Tejada's "Indomable". On screen she is noted as having the perfect three: "performance, ability to take direction and look". In 2011 she was interviewed by Industry magazine for being a reputable actor native to New York. In 2012 Colette kicked off the season three premiere of A & E's The Glades, and appeared in the Netflix horror flick House of Bodies as Sadie Jenkins. In 2013, Colette played Angela, a cancer-stricken woman in One Last Time, directed by Dhimitri Ismailaj. One Last Time was selected for screening at the Cannes Film Festival, and Cinesogni Festival in Ravenna, and several other festival outlets worldwide.  In 2014, Colette joined the cast of Walt Before Mickey alongside Jon Heder, Thomas Ian Nicholas, David Henrie and Arthur L. Bernstein. In 2015, Colette landed the role of Jeanine Markham playing a scientist attempting to disprove the existence of God. She received critical acclaim, and was awarded the 2016 Best Actress Award from the Beverly Hills Film Festival. In 2018, Colette landed the role to play a breast cancer survivor named Willow Adair in the Ziad Hamzeh film Willow, a story based on the novel Walk Beside Me by Christine Handy.

Modeling career
Colette was photographed by famed photographer Philip Lorca DiCorcia in W Magazines "A Perfect World" which was noted by the New York Times as making NYC appear "one-dimensional and depopulated". She modeled for Emmy Award-winning costume designer Birgit Muller, and walked the runway for ELLE's Pink Dress Collection. She has contributed to raising awareness for Haitian victims of the 2010 earthquake, and breast cancer awareness through the Quest project, and Elle's Pink Dress Collection, respectively.

Filmography

References

External links

https://web.archive.org/web/20111112095542/http://www.vangardegirls.com/2011/01/meet-star-introducing-sheena-colette.html
INDUSTRY JAN/FEB 2011 by Industry Magazine

American television actresses
Living people
People from Staten Island
21st-century American actresses
Female models from Florida
American film actresses
Actresses from New York City
People from Boca Raton, Florida
Year of birth missing (living people)